Exercise Commercial Hunter was a program run by the United States Marine Corps (USMC) Marine Corps Warfighting Laboratory. The program is designed to bring in creative unconventional outsiders to anticipate new threats. The program was formed following a recommendation from Naval Research Advisory Committee (NRAC) that the Marine Corps form a "Commercial Hunter" cell whose mission is: "to explore and anticipate the uses of readily available commercial technologies by irregular adversaries to attack key USMC capabilities or vulnerabilities" following a 2008 Naval Research Advisory Committee Study which found that the Marine Corps has no effective methods for anticipating unconventional threats which could be developed using imaginative combinations of commercial products acquired via the Web and distributed by the global supply network.

The term commercial hunter is also used to describe its participants who "hunt" using commercially available goods. Unlike a "Combat Hunter" who uses professional big-game hunters, trackers, and cops on the beat to modify tactics against irregular forces, the "Commercial Hunter" would use outside experts to anticipate, identify, and defeat commercial technology threats. The Commercial Hunter program would anticipate threats via opposing force exercises using teams of smart, young, web-savvy people, from diverse backgrounds. These "commercial hunters" would identify and prioritize threats, buy from the internet creating a prototype to prove technical feasibility, and provoke action.

Cancellation
A part of the exercise was allegedly canceled due to an online blog post in Danger Room by WIRED magazine.

Funding
 The Georgia Tech Information Security Center received a  grant for Information Exploitation: Commercial Hunter.

See also
 Center for Emerging Threats and Opportunities
 Office of Science & Technology Integration

References

Bibliography

External links
 Danger Room What’s Next in National Security Marines Wonder: Where Do You Shop for Bombs Online?, WIRED magazine

Military exercises involving the United States